Bobbin tape lace is bobbin lace where the design is formed of one or more tapes curved so they make an attractive pattern. The tapes are made at the same time as the rest of the lace, and are joined to each other, or themselves, using a crochet hook. 
 
The tapes are made curved, and by hand, using bobbin lace techniques. This should be distinguished from mixed tape lace, which is made using an existing straight tape, often machine made.

Types of bobbin tape lace include Russian lace, Idrija, Schneeberg, Milanese lace and Hinojosa lace.

Bobbin tape lace is sometimes categorized as part lace.

References

Bobbin lace